This is a list of films featuring the United States Marine Corps.

History of Marines in film
Beginning with The Star Spangled Banner (1918), the Marines discovered the use of motion pictures. In exchange for a favorable portrayal that stimulated recruiting and gave an impressive view to the public and Congress, the Marines provided uniformed extras, locations, equipment, and technical advisers that provided their expertise to the producers. In 1926 MGM's Tell It to the Marines and Fox's What Price Glory? directed by Raoul Walsh nearly led to a court battle to see whether one studio could copyright the Marines to prevent other films from being made. Allan Dwan's Sands of Iwo Jima, starring John Wayne, is frequently cited as one of the most influential Marine films. Over the years, Camp Pendleton was dressed up to represent Central American nations, China, Pacific islands, New Zealand, and Joseph H. Lewis's Retreat, Hell! had the base covered in studio snow with their hills and roads painted white. Camp Pendleton later doubled as Vietnam in Marshall Thompson's To the Shores of Hell. When filming Battle Cry at the base in 1954, Raoul Walsh's Marine technical adviser said that he had joined the Corps after seeing What Price Glory?. United States Marine Corps Recruit Training was also depicted in Jack Webb's The D.I. and Stanley Kubrick's Full Metal Jacket that led to more enlistments to the Corps. Most recently, the Gulf and Iraq wars have become the subject of controversial films such as Jarhead and Generation Kill.

List of films

Beachhead - Color 1954 Tony Curtis Lovejoy Four Marines must get message from Bouchard to commanders to prevent Marine casualties on upcoming invasion of Bougainville Island.

Beach Red -

South Pacific -

Snow Falling on Cedars -

|
|-
Ambulance

See also

 Anti-war film
 Cinema of the United States
 List of war films and TV specials
 Propaganda
 War film

United States Marine Corps
United States Marine Corps
Films